Estradiol pivalate, also known as estradiol trimethyl acetate (E2-TMA) and sold under the brand name Estrotate, is an estrogen medication and an estrogen ester; specifically, a pivalic acid (trimethylacetic acid) ester of estradiol. Literature sources are conflicting as to whether the ester is located at the C3 position or at the C17β position. It was marketed as an oil solution for intramuscular injection in the 1940s and 1950s. A combination of estradiol pivalate (1 mg/mL) and progesterone (10 mg/mL) in oil solution for intramuscular injection was available in 1949. An aqueous suspension of estradiol pivalate was also developed by 1950 although whether it was ever marketed is unclear.

The duration of biological effect of estradiol pivalate in women has been studied. It has been found to stimulate the vaginal epithelium in postmenopausal women, with a minimally effective dose of 0.16 mg and a maximally effective dose of 0.5 mg, both by intramuscular injection. Its effect lasted for about 4 weeks at a dose of 0.16 mg and for more than 7 weeks at a dose of 3.3 mg.

Menotrope was an oral tablet that contained 0.33 mg estradiol pivalate, 80 mg choline bitartrate, 0.46 mg folic acid, and 1.25 μg cyanocobalamin (vitamin B12) and was used in menopausal hormone therapy.

See also
 List of estrogen esters § Estradiol esters

References

Abandoned drugs
Estradiol esters
Pivalate esters
Synthetic estrogens